Waun Fach is, with a summit height of , the highest mountain in the Black Mountains in south-eastern Wales. It is one of the three Marilyns over 600 m that make up the range, the others being Black Mountain and Mynydd Troed. To the north Rhos Fawr and the Radnor Forest can be seen. It is the third highest mountain in Britain south of Snowdonia (after Pen y Fan and its near neighbour Corn Du). It is situated at the head of the Grwyne Fechan valley, above and to the west of the Grwyne Fawr reservoir. It has an undistinguished (and almost indistinguishable) rounded summit. The nearby tops on the ridge, Pen Trumau and Pen y Gadair Fawr, although lower, are very much more recognisable.

Geology 
The summit and upper slopes of Waun Fach are formed from the Early Devonian Epoch sandstones of the Brownstones Formation, a division of the Old Red Sandstone. Beneath these and forming the lower slopes are the sandstones of the Senni Formation (traditionally the Senni Beds). Mudstone layers within these sandstones are more readily eroded and have given rise to the stepped appearance of parts of the mountain. No rocks are exposed around its summit as this is covered by a thick layer of peat which has accumulated in the postglacial period, though is much reduced through erosion in recent decades.

Access
The hill is wholly within land mapped under the Countryside and Rights of Way Act 2000 as open country and hence is legally available to walkers despite there being no public rights of way leading to it. Mountain bikers and horseriders can follow the bridleways which lead to the 617m high col south of Pen Trumau but have no legal access to the hill itself.  The paths approaching from the north and west have been repaired and improved by the Brecon Beacons National Park Authority, most recently through the Black Mountains Land Use Partnership in recent years, having previously become particularly damaged by use.

References

External links
 Computer generated summit panoramas:
 Waun Fach 
 Index
 www.geograph.co.uk : photos of Waun Fach and surrounding area

Marilyns of Wales
Hewitts of Wales
Nuttalls
Landmarks in Wales
Mountains and hills of Powys
Black Mountains, Wales
Talgarth